Micah Garen is an American documentary filmmaker and journalist whose work has focused on conflict zones in the Middle East and Afghanistan. He is notable for surviving a kidnapping ordeal in Iraq in 2004. He wrote a book about the kidnapping incident which included his confinement as well as the efforts of friends and relatives to secure his release; according to a report in Kirkus Reviews, the book was "extraordinarily compelling" and "gripping." In addition, Garen is a prize-winning photographer. He has written for Vanity Fair, Newsweek, The New York Times and other publications. Micah Garen and Marie-Helene Carleton have directed four documentaries for Al Jazeera's Correspondent series, including Identity and Exile: an American's struggle with Zionism featuring photojournalist Matthew Cassel.  The film was awarded the top Golden Nymph prize at the Monte Carlo Television Festival in 2014. Garen has made a number of short documentaries, including one describing the lives of Egyptian women during the political upheavals in 2011 one on an American airman killed in Afghanistan and one on refugees fleeing Turkey to Greece by boat. With Marie-Hélène Carleton, Garen is working on a feature documentary from Iraq entitled The Road to Nasiriyah which was selected for Film Independent's inaugural documentary lab in 2011.
Garen founded ScreeningRoom in 2015, an online community for filmmakers with tools including collaborative feedback on cuts, festival submissions and film grants.

Kidnapping ordeal
Garen spent months in Iraq documenting the "systematic dismantling" of the nation's cultural and archaeological legacy, according to one report. On August 13, 2004, while he was in a market taking photographs with a regular camera, Garen and his Iraqi translator, Amir Doshi, were kidnapped by Shia extremists and they were held hostage in Nasiriya in southern Iraq. On August 19, a video aired on al-Jazeera in which Garen appeared sitting on the floor in front of masked insurgents with weapons making demands for his release. The kidnapping story drew international media attention. During the captivity, there was a strong behind-the-scenes effort to encourage Iraqi authority figures to secure his release, partially by his partner, Marie-Helene Carleton, Garen's sister Eva Garen, as well as people within Yale University, where Garen's father is a professor. His captors eventually turned Garen and his translator over to representatives of Moqtada al-Sadr in Nasiriya, unharmed, on August 22, 2004. He said he was very thankful to the cleric and his aides for their efforts at getting him released. After being released, he said he wanted to stay in Iraq to continue with his documentary project.

A week before his kidnapping, Garen and Doshi investigated Italian army reports of a car bomb that had been shot at in Nasiriyah and exploded during fighting between the Medhi Army and the Italian military.  They found that the reported car bomb was not a car bomb, but an ambulance with five civilians who had been killed, including a pregnant woman who was being taken to a hospital north of the city.  Garen and Doshi conducted interviews with the ambulance driver who survived and the hospital that dispatched the ambulance, as well as filmed the bodies in the morgue, and the remains of the ambulance on the bridge.  They gave parts of their footage to an Italian TV channel staying on the Italian base in Nasiriyah, as the TV station was unable to travel into Nasiriyah and investigate themselves.  Italian television aired the story and it cause a huge uproar, as it was the first time the Italian military had been accused of wrongdoing in Iraq.  General Dalzini denied the Italian military had shot an ambulance.  Immediately following, Garen and Doshi were interrogated for many hours by the Italian military.  Garen left the Italian military base, where he had been staying, for Baghdad.  Two years after the incident, three soldiers were indicted for shooting at the ambulance, the first time Italian soldiers had been indicted for a crime during the Iraq war.

Publications
 Micah Garen and Marie-Hélène Carlton, American Hostage: A Memoir of a Journalist Kidnapped in Iraq and the Remarkable Battle to Win His Release. New York: Simon & Schuster, 2005.  (hardback). New York: Simon & Schuster, 2007.  (paperback).
 "The Looting of the Iraq Museum, Baghdad: The Lost Legacy of Ancient Mesopotamia" Harry N. Abrams, 2005.

Filmography
Death in the Family 
Light on the Sea
Off the Rails
Who Owns Yoga
Once Upon a Time in Sarajevo
Identity & Exile
Call Me Ehsaan
Fahrenheit 911 (filmed Christmas Eve raid scene)

Awards 
 Winner of the Golden Nymph for Best News Documentary at the 2014 Festival de Television de Monte Carlo
 Finalist New York Festivals History and Society for Al Jazeera Correspondent Film Off the Rails: A Journey through Japan
 2009 Webby Honoree Deep Divide
 2014 Webby Honoree The Daily Struggle of Lebanon's One Million Syrian Refugees
 First Place Gallery Photographica competition 2012

References

Guardian Photographs of the Week
https://www.theguardian.com/artanddesign/gallery/2019/mar/23/the-20-photographs-of-the-week

External links
Four Corners Media
ScreeningRoom

Vanity Fair contributor
Al Jazeera contributor

Cornell University alumni
Living people
American documentary filmmakers
1968 births